Shahad Al Rawi (Arabic: شهد الراوي) is an Iraqi author, Anthropologist, and novelist. She was born and raised in Baghdad, Iraq. Her debut novel The Baghdad Clock (2016) was nominated for the Arabic Booker Prize and was shortlisted, marking herself the youngest author to reach the list at that time. It has also been translated into more than 20 languages. The Baghdad Clock then went onto win the First Book Award at the Edinburgh International Book Festival.

Biography
Al-Rawi was born in Baghdad, Iraq on February 1, 1986, to Iraqi parents, her origins go back to the city of Rawa, in the Anbar Province, in western Iraq. She completed her high school education in Baghdad and then left Iraq for Syria after 2003, she then completed her college degree at Damascus University (Syria) obtaining a bachelor's degree from the College of Management and Economics in Business Administration.She then obtained a master's degree in Human Resource Management at the same university. Shahd Al-Rawi completed her PhD with Distinction in Administrative Anthropology in 2019 in the United Arab Emirates.

During multiple articles and interviews she highlights that her family is a regular middle class Iraqi family, her father an Academic and economist, and her mother a pharmacist. She mentions them as a major influence in encouraging her to write and have supported her along her journey.

Writing career
Al-Rawi's career began through a number of essays and poems some of which were published in major Arab newspapers, publications, and through social media platforms which garnered the public's attention to the relatively young author's early writing talent. Writing almost exclusively in the Arabic language, Al-Rawi displays a deep understanding of her audience, in particular middle class Iraqi females, and the general Iraqi and Arab population. Her background in the humanities, in particular Anthropology have reflected clearly in her ability to communicate complex ideas through her novels representing individual and ethnographic changes in pre-war, post-war, and at war populations. Some of these represent the Mahalla المحلة as a ship at sea, its inhabitants reflecting a demographic voiced through their day to day conversations throughout her debut novel The Baghdad Clock in particular.

Coming of age in wartime
The author's debut novel The Baghdad Clock received acclaim for its technical prowess in channeling time as a narrator within an unconventional structure. Its narrative is described by critics as carrying a boldness in which the author goes beyond the logical and temporal succession of events, incorporating dreams, memories and illusions into reality and vice versa, to tell the story of a generation born to war, and raised under sanctions only to usher in yet another war.

Described by critics as a skilfully interwoven fantasy and reality with a fine thread. She draws you through the story, leading you from one maze into another, as you stagger along in a state of perplexity, amazement and sheer delight.''

During an interview Al-Rawi says, “My novel about the people of my generation and my city, Baghdad, which I left and did not leave me, about our childhood, adolescence, youth, and our hopes and dreams which I tried to protect from forgetfulness and prevent from being lost". Incorporating memory and illusion, after limiting the role of reason and logic in drawing the expected natural endings, the author allows for open ended and unanswered questions, as does life in its entirety. And she adds, “Technically, I owe a lot not to the great international novelists who I have read some of their works, but to the young female novelists who have begun to take their rightful places in the postmodern novel, especially in the US, Canada, Australia and the United Kingdom, and whom I consider the first wave of female novelists of the era. Such authors I've been influenced by include Emma Cline, Jojo Moyes, H. L. Dennis and others, as the novel has become with them a world of deep emotional flow, which does not hesitate to accept illusions and dreams as a real part of the living reality, and they have no problem for magic to interfere in changing the direction of events and its reformulation without sacrificing reality".

A multigenerational reality onslaught
In what some critics described as a temporal continuation of Al-Rawi's debut novel, in Over The Jumhuriya Bridge (2020) the reader follows scenes from the US led invasion of Iraq in 2003 and events immediately leading up to them, affecting not one but three generations at once: grandparents, parents and children, and how one site, The Jumhuriya Bridge (The Republican Bridge) in the capital city of Baghdad, played a major role in the lives of one family representing the typical middle class Iraqi family.

The novel begins and ends with a bridge, and just as it represents hope and change, it is also a source of danger and despair. Thinking about the bridge and its symbolic meaning in the novel, we realize that just as bridges are the way in which we cross the river from one side to the other without much thought about what awaits us, in the novel it is the decisive factor in the fate of each character, as well as the separation between the new and the old, life and death.

The heroine of "Over the Jumhuriya Bridge" recalls how American tanks crossed into the heart of Baghdad, indicating the end of Iraq that everyone knew and the beginning of the unknown journey that many people had to take.

Like most of Iraq's citizens, the heroine and her family left her country for a neighboring country to start a new life, but they lose their mother to a fatal illness early in the story. Then the reader is once again stunned by the use of symbolism, whether intended or not. The loss of the mother is the loss of the homeland, security and belonging. This is evidenced by the anonymous protagonist of the novel, who in the book does not have any clear sense of belonging, not with her sister, father, cousin, or friends. Even when she is trying to fall in love, it seems like a half-hearted attempt, confirming that she has no sense of belonging.

In “Over the Jumhuriya Bridge,” the theme of escaping and longing for the past is evident at every turn, even before the family leaves Iraq. There is a feeling of a mother's longing for the past when she talks about her school, and that people often look romantically at the past, but in the novel even good times are tinged with sadness like the death of her uncle during the first war that Iraq suffered in the eighties of the last century.

Following Al-Rawi's debut novel, readers can observe a sense of maturity in the novel, perhaps evident in the way in which all the characters are given space to form a bond with the readers, all of which are multidimensional with flaws and attractive qualities. Basically, these characters have been humanized through their contradictory qualities, bringing a sense of realism readers can connect with.

Regardless of your nationality or background, "Over the Bridge of the Republic" is a suggestion for reading to anyone who has suffered loss. It is a journey of acceptance of reality, and on this trip you will meet many personalities who shape your thoughts and aspirations in life.

References

Iraqi writers
1986 births
Living people